Denis Joseph Hickie (12 April 1943 – 26 December 2021) was an Irish rugby union player. He played as a number 8 for St. Mary's College, Leinster and Ireland.

Career

Hickie, along with his brother Tony, played on the first team from St Mary's College to win the Leinster Schools Rugby Senior Cup in 1961 and they were also part of a successful era for the St. Mary's R.F.C. teams during the 1970s. Hickie captained St Mary's for three seasons and played on three Leinster Senior Cup-winning teams. He was also part of the 1975 team that won the Club Championship of Ireland, to celebrate the IRFU’s 100th anniversary. A career which featured 23 caps for Leinster and one cap for the Barbarians (1972), Hickie became one of the first St Mary's RFC players to be capped for Ireland. He won six caps throughout 1971 and 1972.

Personal life and death

His son, Gavin Hickie, played with St Mary's and for Leinster during the Matt Williams era. His nephew, also Denis, played with Leinster for 12 seasons, Ireland and the British and Irish Lions.

Hickie died after a long period of ill health and dementia on 26 December 2021.

Honours

St Mary's College
Leinster Schools Rugby Senior Cup: 1961

St Mary's College RFC
Leinster Senior Cup: 1969, 1971, 1974

References

1943 births
2021 deaths
Ireland international rugby union players
Irish rugby union players
Leinster Rugby players
Rugby union players from Dublin (city)
St Mary's College RFC players
People educated at St Mary's College, Dublin
Barbarian F.C. players
Rugby union number eights